Veer Narmad South Gujarat University is a public university located in the city of Surat, Gujarat, India. Previously known as South Gujarat University, it was renamed as Veer Narmad South Gujarat University(VNSGU) in 2004 in honour of the famous scholar and Gujarati poet Narmad. Established  in 1965, the university offers undergraduate and postgraduate courses, including non-traditional postgraduate departments such as public administration, rural studies, comparative literature, and aquatic biology.

History and profile 

The University was established by the South Gujarat University Act, 1965. It opened in 1966 and was incorporated as a University on 23 May 1967, and has been recognised by the University Grants Commission in 1968.  VNSGU is the first university in India to offer postgraduate courses in rural studies. In 2004, it was renamed as Veer Narmad South Gujarat University after the Gujarat poet Veer Narmad whose real name was Narmadshankar Labhshankar Dave.

Campus 
An urban University located in the city of (Vesu)Surat, the University has a campus spread over 810 acres. Over 3000 students study on the campus. The University has faculties of Arts, Commerce, Science, Education, Management Studies, Rural Studies, Engineering and Technology, Medicine, Law and new constituted Computer Science, Homoeopathy and Architecture. Several major and minor research projects are taking place in various departments. All the departments have their own computer laboratories and departmental libraries. The central library with over 1.72 lakh books and subscribes to over 242 national and international journals and 6000 e-journals.

The University campus houses 80 buildings that include 6 Boys' Hostels and 5 Girls' Hostels, besides a Gymnasium, a Health Centre, an Indoor Stadium and residential quarters for its staff. There is also a day care centre. Sports facilities include a fitness centre, basketball court and playground with tracks. CB Patel International Cricket Stadium is a cricket stadium located in the university. The ground covers 3.75 lakh sq. ft meeting the standards of international stadiums, and can accommodate 35,000 people. Then Gujarat Chief Minister and Gujarat Cricket Association head Narendra Modi laid the foundation of the stadium in November 2009. The ground received a donation from a cricket lover Kamlesh Patel. He donated Rs. 5 crore. In February 2011, Narendra Modi then Chief Minister of Gujarat and Gujarat Cricket Association Chief inaugurated the stadium and the stadium is still awaiting for BCCI approval for domestic and international matches.

Affiliated colleges 
The Veer Narmad South Gujarat University has 290 college affiliations as per year 2019-2020.

Departments 

The following Teaching Departments are located on-campus of Veer Narmad South Gujarat University:
 Department of Aquatic Biology
 Department of Architecture
 Department of Biology
 Department of Biotechnology
 Department of Business and Industrial Management
 Department of Chemistry
 Department of Commerce
 Department of Comparative Literature
 Department of Computer Science 
 Department of Economics
 Department of Education
 Department of English
 Department of Gujarati
 Department of ICT
 Department of Journalism and Mass Communication
 Department of Law
 Department of Library and Information Science
 Department of Mathematics
 Department of Physics
 Department of Public administration
 Department of Human Resource Development
 Department of Rural Studies
 Department of Sociology
 Department of Statistics
 Department of Fine Arts
 University Science Instrument Center

Museums
Narmad Smriti Bhavan is a replica of Sarika Sadan, house of Narmad which displayed his works and belongings.

Notable alumni 
Phoolchand Gupta
Raeesh Maniar
Esha Dadawala
Bhagwatikumar Sharma
Ravindra Parekh
Dhwanil Parekh
Kiransinh Chauhan

Notable faculty
Jagdeep Smart (1956–2009), former Professor of Fine Arts

See also
List of tourist attractions in Surat

References

Veer Narmad South Gujarat University
Education in Surat
1965 establishments in Gujarat
Educational institutions established in 1965